Radmind is a suite of Unix command-line tools and an application server designed to remotely administer the file systems of multiple client machines.

For Mac OS X, there is a graphical user interface called Radmind Assistant, as well as a GUI for the Radmind server called Radmind Server Manager.

Radmind was the 2003 Apple Design Awards runner-up for Best Mac OS X Server Solution.

Radmind is developed by the Research Systems Unix Group at the University of Michigan.

How Radmind Works 
Radmind operates as a tripwire, detecting changes in a client's filesystem (and, in the case of Microsoft Windows, the registry) and reversing the changes. Radmind stores filesystem specifications in text files called transcripts, signified with a .T extension.  Transcripts are referenced from command files, signified with a .K extension, which specify which transcripts (and with what precedence) should be applied to a client machine's filesystem.

Suite of tools 
The radmind suite of tools comprises

 ktcheck, which updates the locally stored command files and transcripts to match those on the server.
 fsdiff, which checks the client filesystem against the transcripts on the local system without using network bandwidth.
 lapply, which updates the client filesystem to match the transcripts, downloading files as needed.
 lcreate, which uploads new transcripts to the server.
 lcksum, which verifies uploaded transcripts.
 lfdiff, which compares local files with copies on Radmind server.
 lmerge, which combines transcripts on the server.
 ra.sh , which automates the update process using ktcheck, fsdiff, and lapply.
 twhich, which returns which transcript(s) a file is referenced in.
 applefile, which allows Radmind to work with AppleSingle files.

References

External links
Radmind wiki
Radmind Manual for Mac OS X
Radmind Deployment & Implementation Documentation

Remote administration software
File managers
Software using the BSD license